Il Palazzo incantato (The Enchanted Palace) or Il Palagio d’Atlante, overo La Guerriera Amante (The Palace of Atlantes, or The Warrior Woman in Love), or also Lealtà con valore (Loyalty with Bravery) is an opera in a prologue and three acts by the Italian composer Luigi Rossi. The libretto, by Giulio Rospigliosi, the future Pope Clement IX, is based on Ariosto's Orlando furioso. It was first performed in Rome in a lavish production at the Teatro delle Quattro Fontane (Palazzo Barberini) on 22 February 1642. Rossi was criticised for giving too much music to his friend, the castrato Marc'Antonio Pasqualini, who played Bradamante, at the expense of the other roles. Some of the highly complicated stage machinery failed to work during the performance. 
Revived by Opera Dijon in a January 2021 online production.

Roles

Synopsis
The magician Atlante captures Christian and pagan knights and ladies in his enchanted palace of illusions. Orlando, Ferraù and Sacripante enter the palace in search of Angelica. Bradamante seeks Ruggiero and, finding him with Angelica, vows to kill him in a fit of jealous rage. But Atlante calms things by reminding Angelica of her love for Medoro. Atlante feels threatened when Astolfo arrives as the knight is immune to his magic. Atlante convinces his captives that Astolfo is the enemy. Meanwhile, Ruggiero has broken the spell. Atlante responds by disguising himself as Ruggiero but when he is faced with a duel with the real Ruggiero he is forced to admit defeat. The magic palace vanishes and the knights and ladies are freed.

Notes

Sources
Marina Vaccarini, "Palazzo incantato, Il, (Il Palagio d'Atlante, o vero La guerriera amante)", in Gelli, Piero & Poletti Filippo eds. (2007). Dizionario dell'Opera 2008, Milan: Baldini Castoldi Dalai, pp. 972–973.  – via operamanager.com

Further reading
The Viking Opera Guide, ed. Amanda Holden (Viking, 1993)
 Murata, Margaret, "Operas for the Papal Court, 1631–1668)", UMI Research Press, Ann Arbor, Michigan 1981, p. 47 (9780835711227)

External links
Libretto, librettidopera.it
Il Palazzo incantato di Atlante, ovvero La Guerriera amante, Le magazine de l'opéra baroque by Jean-Claude Brenac]

Italian-language operas
Operas by Luigi Rossi
1642 operas
Operas